Utricularia mangshanensis is a carnivorous plant belonging to the genus Utricularia. This species is known only from the Mangshan Mountains of Hunan Province, China. It is thought to be most closely related to U. peranomala.

See also 
 List of Utricularia species

References 

Carnivorous plants of Asia
Flora of China
Plants described in 2007
mangshanensis